Quartan fever is one of the four types of malaria which can be contracted by humans.

It is specifically caused by the Plasmodium malariae species, one of the six species of the protozoan genus Plasmodium. Quartan fever is a form of malaria where an onset of fever occurs in an interval of three to four days, hence the name "quartan". It is transmitted by bites of infected female mosquitoes of the genus Anopheles. Although cases of malaria have occurred throughout the world, quartan fever typically occurs in the subtropics. Quartan fever is considered to be a less severe form of malaria fever that can be cured by anti-malarial medication, and prevention methods can be taken in order to avoid infection.

Cause 

The female Anopheles mosquito is a vector which transmits quartan fever to people. Mature mosquitoes carry uninucleate sporozoites in their salivary glands; these sporozoites enter a human's bloodstream when mosquitoes puncture human flesh during feeding.  Sporozoites attack and inhabit liver parenchymal cells, called hepatocytes, in order to develop further. Once the uninucleate sporozoites have matured, the sporozoites then develop into uninucleate merozoites. Uninucleated merozoites mature into an erythrocytic stage called schizonts which contain merozoites. The schizonts, an infected erythrocyte, then rupture to release these merozoites; leading to more infections in the red blood cells. Uninucleated merozoites can also mature into uninucleate gametocytes which can invade and infect other female Anopheles mosquitoes during feeding, thus spreading the disease onto a wider population of humans.

Diagnosis 
Fevers in intervals of 72 hours distinguish quartan fever from other forms of malaria where fevers range in 48 hour intervals or fever spikes that occur sporadically.

Early indications of quartan fever include having irritated spots, welts, hives and burning skin, however this is dependent on individual's tolerance to mosquito bites and may not be evident on some people. With the Anopheles malaria mosquitoes, the welts are most likely to not appear unless there are severe allergic reactions.

The prepatent period is the time interval for when parasites infect a host and when they can be detected on a thick blood film. For quartan fever, P. malariae has a prepatent period ranging from 16 to 59 days. Specifically in the case of quartan fever, the rupturing of liver stage schizonts releases merozoites. This stage of the P. malariae life cycle is known as the "ring stages" and are the first stages which can be detected in human blood for diagnosis.

Medical procedures that diagnose a patient with quartan fever 

 Blood smears can be used to detect the parasites within red blood cells, thick blood smears are typically used initially to detect the parasites, then it is followed by thin blood smears which can detect the parasites as the morphology of erythrocytes is maintained through the process.
Peripheral blood films stained with Giemsa stain are a method of blood examination used to diagnose the presence of Plasmodium malariae, and detect quartan fever.
 Rapid diagnostic tests can detect the antigens which cause malaria, a sample of blood is collected from the patient and placed on a test card. After 15–20 minutes bands show up on the test card which indicate the specific species of malaria the patient is infected with.
 Serological tests are used in general to detect whether a patient has developed antibodies to specific microorganism, therefore serological tests are used to detect past encounters with Plasmodium virus rather than acute cases where a patient has just been infected with P. malariae and has quartan fever.
Polymerase chain reactions (PCR) are used to diagnosis Plasmodium malariae (cause of quartan fever) as well as to distinguish mixed infections with different species of Plasmodium.

Treatment 

 Chloroquine is an anti-malarial medication administered in the form of a tablet for ingestion.
Chloroquine is a water-soluble drug which is used to treat quartan fever. It is ingested in a compressed tablet form and is absorbed by the gastrointestinal tract.
 Hydroxychloroquine, another anti-malarial, is used to treat quartan fever. Hydroxychloroquine is also typically administered to patients with lupus flares.
 Both hydroxychloroquine and  chloroquine have a side effect of retinal toxicity when administered to infected patients.
 Adverse effects  of the drug chloroquine  include agitation, anxiety, confusion, gastrointestinal discomfort, blurring vision and/or irreversible retinopathy.
 Sulfadoxine-pyrimethamine (SP) is administered to pregnant women. Two to three doses of SP has been proven to reduce the levels of placental malaria  and had a reduced risk of moderate to severe anemia.

Prevention 

Ways to minimise exposure to the Anopheles mosquito include:

 Indoor residual sprays are one of the most utilised methods of malaria prevention by the Global Malaria Eradication Campaign. Spraying is a method used to control malaria epidemics.
Nets treated with insecticide are effective at preventing mosquito contact for three years. The World Health Organization (WHO) specifically protects younger children and pregnant women in order to reduce the risk of spreading quartan fever within the population.
Sulfadoxine-pyrimethamine (SP) administration to pregnant women is also a source of prevention in order to reduce the risks of maternal anaemia, low birth rate, and perinatal mortality. SP reduces the impact quartan fever may have on newborns and decrease the mortality rate. This method of prevention is known as "chemoprevention."

 House improvement is also a method of prevention. Traditional houses consisting of natural materials are susceptible to gaps which allow entry to Anopheles mosquitoes. House improvements including sealed windows and doors reduce the risk of coming in contact with the infected mosquitoes.
 Larval source management is the control and monitoring of aquatic environments in order to prevent Anopheles mosquitoes from fully developing. Mosquitoes require aquatic environments in order to fully mature and develop. Once the mosquito eggs hatch, the larva must live in the water and develop into pupa. The pupa stage then matures into a fully developed mosquito and emerges from its aquatic habitat. When removing any water-filled containers from the surrounding area the mosquito life cycle is halted and acts as a method to reduce mosquito population within the surrounding area.
 Clothing can act as a physical barrier to prevent exposure of flesh for mosquitoes to feed on, treating beds and clothing with insecticides/repellents can further reduce chances of infected mosquitoes from biting and passing quartan fever to individuals.
 Avoiding areas which have high mosquito populations, specifically for quartan fever the P. malariae strain.
 Avoiding travelling to regions which have a subtropical climate to prevent infection and developing quartan fever.
Implementing the sugar baiting method aids in reducing the population of Anopheles mosquitoes, and ultimately reducing the likelihood of catching quartan fever. Both male and female mosquitoes feed on the attractive toxic sugar bait (ATSB)  and ingest low-risk oral toxins e.g. boric acid. This leads to mosquito death and reduces population.

References

Epidemiology
Malaria